Carolyn Richmond is a literary scholar and translator.

After specializing in Spanish literature, she devoted herself to Leopoldo Alas, Benito Pérez Galdós, Ramón Gómez de la Serna and Miguel Delibes, among others.

She was the second wife of Spanish literary scholar and novelist Francisco Ayala, whose works she also translated into English.

References

American academics
Literary scholars
Spanish–English translators